David Lindsay, 3rd Earl of Crawford (died 24 January 1445) was a regent to James II of Scotland. He was a member of Clan Lindsay, a Scottish Lowland clan. He was the son of Alexander Lindsay, 2nd Earl of Crawford by his wife Marjorie.

At the Battle of Arbroath in 1445 the Clan Lindsay, led by the Master of Crawford, advanced with over 1000 men. Their enemy was the Clan Ogilvy who were also supported by men from the Clan Oliphant, Clan Gordon, Clan Seton and Clan Forbes of Pitsligo. The Earl, who was the Master of Crawford's father, rode between the two armies in an attempt to call a truce. However, an ill-advised Ogilvie, thinking that this was the start of the Lindsay's attack, threw his spear at the Earl, hitting him in the mouth and killing him instantly. So the battle began which went in the Clan Lindsay's favour.

Marriage and issue
Crawford married Marjory Ogilvie, daughter of Alexander Ogilvie of Auchterhouse. By her he had issue:

Alexander Lindsay, 4th Earl of Crawford, called "Tiger Earl" or "Earl Beardie." He married Elizabeth Dunbar, of the house of March (Earl of March), and his son, David Lindsay, 5th Earl of Crawford (d.1495), was created Duke of Montrose on 18 May 1488.
Walter of Beaufort and Edzell, styled of Kinblethmont, had charters of the baronies of Arde and Bewfort in 1459, and of the barony of Panbride in 1463. He married first Sophia, daughter of Livingston of Saltcoats, but by her had no issue. He married again to Isabel, daughter of Livingston of Saltcoats, and had 10 children
William Lindsay of Lekoquhy
Sir John Lindsay (k. 1452- Battle of Brechin)
James, who founded a house in Augsburg, Germany.
Janet Lindsay, married William Douglas, 6th Earl of Douglas
Elizabeth Lindsay

References

Notes

Sources
Paul, Sir James Balfour, Scots Peerage Vol. IX. Edinburgh, 1904

1446 deaths
3
David
Year of birth unknown